Chitiram Pesuthadi is an Indian Tamil-language soap opera that aired Monday through Friday on Jaya TV from 9 December 2013 to 17 October 2014 for 217 episodes.

The show starred Rathi, Priyanka, Vidhiya, V. Thiruselvam and Sathyapriya among others. It was produced, Written and director by V. Thiruselvam.

Cast

Main cast

 Rathi (Epi:1-92) / Priyanka (Epi: 93-217) as Thenmozhi
 Vidhiya
 Hansika
 Ramya as Kunthavi
 V. Thiruselvam
 Pooja as Thamayanthi
 Sridevi as Manimehalai

Additional cast

 Sathyapriya
 Vijay Kirushnaraj
 Bharathy
 Mogan Vaithiya
 Piraksh Rajan
 Sharavan
 Pavakal
 Ramesh
 Giri
 Karpakam

References

External links
official website 
Jaya TV on Youtube
Chithiram Pesudhadi Serial on Youtube

Jaya TV television series
2013 Tamil-language television series debuts
2010s Tamil-language television series
Tamil-language television shows
2014 Tamil-language television series endings